Mekanïk Kommandöh is an album by French rock band Magma. It was recorded in 1973, but not released until 1989. The album consists of an early rendition of the band's classic record Mëkanïk Dëstruktïẁ Kömmandöh. This alternate take features a rawer, more stripped-down mix that pushes the drums upfront and does not contain the horns and other melodic instruments. It includes a doom-laden introduction delivered by Christian Vander which was not used in the following version.

Track listing 
 "Mëkanïk Dëstruktïẁ Kömmandöh" - 37:51

Musicians 
 Klaus Blasquiz – vocals, percussion
 Rene Garber – bass clarinet, vocals
 Stella Vander – vocals
 Choirs De La Stochhaus – choir
 Jean Luc Manderlier – piano, organ
 Jean Pierre Lambert – bass
 Christian Vander – drums, vocals, organ, percussion

References 

Magma (band) albums
1989 albums